Royal Air Force Bisterne or more simply RAF Bisterne is a former Royal Air Force Advanced Landing Ground in Hampshire, England.

Opened in March 1944, Bisterne was a prototype for the type of temporary Advanced Landing Ground type airfield that would be built in France after D-Day, when the need advanced landing fields would become urgent as the Allied forces moved east across France and Germany.  It was used by the United States Army Air Force as a fighter airfield.  It was closed late in the summer of 1944.

Today the airfield is a mixture of agricultural fields with no recognizable remains.

History

Bisterne was used by the No. 2774 Squadron RAF Regiment.

Bisterne was known as USAAF Station AAF-415 for security reasons by the USAAF during the war, and by which it was referred to instead of location.  Its USAAF Station Code was "BS".

On 7 March 1944 the 371st Fighter Group arrived .  Equipped with Republic P-47 Thunderbolts, the 347th FG arrived from Richmond AAF Virginia.  Tactical squadrons of the group and squadron fuselage codes were:
 404th Fighter Squadron (9Q)
 405th Fighter Squadron (8N)
 406th Fighter Squadron (4W)

The 371st was a group of Ninth Air Force's 70th Fighter Wing, IX Tactical Air Command. The 371st moved from Bisterne between 17 and 29 June 1944 to its Advanced Landing Ground (ALG) at Beuzeville France (ALG A-6).

Current use

In 2004 a small memorial was dedicated by a former P47D pilot on the outskirts of Brixey's Farm yard barn at the end of the metalled bridleway eastwards off the B3347 at Kingston as a lasting memorial to the men and machines who flew from the wartime Bisterne airfield.<Bisterne Estate>

See also

List of former Royal Air Force stations

References

Further reading
 Freeman, Roger A. (1994) UK Airfields of the Ninth: Then and Now 1994. After the Battle 
 Freeman, Roger A. (1996) The Ninth Air Force in Colour: UK and the Continent-World War Two. After the Battle 
 Maurer, Maurer (1983). Air Force Combat Units Of World War II. Maxwell AFB, Alabama: Office of Air Force History. .

External links

 Photographs of RAF Bisterne from the Geograph British Isles project
 Full listing of units at RAF Bisterne
 Wartime US pilot returns for flying visit to Blisterne Airfield

Royal Air Force stations in Hampshire
Airfields of the IX Fighter Command in the United Kingdom
Military airbases established in 1944
Military installations closed in 1944
Ringwood, Hampshire